ICv2 is an online trade magazine that covers geek culture for retailers. ICv2s main areas of focus are comic books, anime, gaming, and show business products. The site offers news, reviews, analysis, and sales information for retailers and librarians. ICv2 holds an annual trade conference in conjunction with the New York Comic Con; the company also periodically publishes ICv2 Retailer Guides in hard copy format.

The site is produced by GCO, LLC, based in Madison, Wisconsin.

Name
ICv2 stands for Internal Correspondence version 2''', named after a trade magazine published in the 1980s-1990s by Capital City Distribution. 

 History 
Capital City Distribution co-founder Milton Griepp published Internal Correspondence, first as a newsletter and then as a magazine, until Capital City was acquired by Diamond Comic Distributors in 1996, retaining rights to the name. He launched ICv2 in January 2001. The ICv2 Retailer Guides magazines were launched in 2002.

In 2011, ICv2 began holding an industry conference on the eve of the New York Comic Con, at the Jacob K. Javits Convention Center. Held annually, the ICv2 event is now known as the "White Paper Happy Hour."

Griepp (on behalf of ICv2'') supervised the 2015 American Anime Awards balloting.

References

External links 
 

Online magazines published in the United States
Professional and trade magazines
Magazines established in 2001
Magazines published in Wisconsin
Magazines about comics